The 2015 Virsligas Winter Cup is the league cup's third season. It began on 19 January 2015. Skonto are the defending champion.

Group stage
The top two from each group advance to the Knockout stage. The third placed teams play each other to determine two more teams to join them.

Group A

 FK Daugava Riga is removed from the Winter Cup 2015

Group B

Additional Games

7th Place

5th Place

3rd Place

Final

References

Virsligas Winter Cup
Virsligas Winter Cup